Miguel de Toro Domínguez (born 16 August 1993) is a Spanish water polo player. He competed in the 2020 Summer Olympics.

References

1993 births
Living people
Sportspeople from Barcelona
Sportspeople from Seville
Water polo players at the 2020 Summer Olympics
Spanish male water polo players
Olympic water polo players of Spain
World Aquatics Championships medalists in water polo
21st-century Spanish people